Matina (Maglaj) is a village in the municipality of Žepče, Zenica-Doboj Canton, Federation of Bosnia and Herzegovina, Bosnia and Herzegovina.

Demographics 
According to the 2013 census, its population was 497.

References

Populated places in Žepče